Bhanai is a village in Bhadra Tehsil in the Hanumangarh district of Rajasthan State, India. It belongs to Bikaner Division. It is located 137 km to the east of district headquarters Hanumangarh, 18 km from Bhadra, and 280 km from the state capital, Jaipur.

Bhanai Pin code is 335501 and postal office is Bhanai. Its Telephone Code / Std Code is 01504.

Demographics
Rajasthani is the local language.
Haryanvi tone mixup with Rajasthani (madhur language).
This type of language generally used in Bhanai.

Nearby
Anoop Shahar (3.5 km), Ajeet Pura (6 km), Bhadi (6 km), Uttardabas (04 km), Sidhmukh (12 km) are the nearby villages to Bhanai. Bhanai is surrounded by Siwani Tehsil to the east, Rajgarh Tehsil to the south, Taranagar Tehsil to the south, Adampur Tehsil to the north.

Bhadra, Taranagar, Nohar, Hisar, Rajgarh (Churu) are the nearby cities.

Population
Total Population (01/04/2013):
Male Population	     1305
Female Population    1200
Total Population     2505

Geography
Bhanai Latitude-28.96, Longitude-75.25
Time zone:  IST (UTC+5:30)
Elevation / Altitude: 201 meters. Above Sea level

Transport
Anupshahr Railway Station, Sidmukh Railway Station and Bhadra Railway Station are nearby railway stations. However, Sadulpur Jn Railway Station is major railway station 44 km from Bhanai.

Education
Colleges nearby are:
1. Sardar Vallabh Bhai Patel Mahavidyalaya
Address : Bhadra
2. vivekanand PG college 
Address : Bhadra

Schools in Bhanai
 Maharana Partap Public School, Bhanai
 Gramothan Sen. Sec. School, Bhanai
 Vidhya Bharti Public School
 Govt. Primary School (Girls), Bhanai
 Govt. Sec. School, Bhanai

Villages in Hanumangarh district